The  or PS/55 is a personal computer series released from IBM Japan in 1987.

The PS/55 is the successor to IBM 5550 (Multistation 5550), but its architecture is based upon IBM PS/2, perhaps it is also an IBM clone. The first line-up of the series consisted of rebranded 5550 models except the Model 5570-S which was based on the PS/2 Model 80 (IBM 8580). Unlike the PS/2, most PS/2-based models have a 32-bit (80386 or 80486) CPU and Micro Channel (MCA) bus for the high-end business computing market. IBM Japan was hesitating to sell personal computers for consumers because the IBM JX failed. The AT bus model was released for home users in 1991.

Features

Display Adapter 

 
The MCA video card called Display Adapter has a Japanese font containing nearly 7,000 glyphs stored in its ROM, which enables PS/2-based computers to display Japanese text without loading the font into memory. Similar to the IBM 5550, the display resolution in character mode is 1040×725 pixels (12×24 and 24×24 pixel Mincho font, 80×25 text) in 8 colors. The graphics mode is 1024×768 pixels in 16 colors. This is the same resolution as 8514/A and XGA/A, but not compatible.

The first Display Adapter was installed in the model 5570-S, also known as the first Micro Channel machine of PS/55. It had a compatibility problem with PS/2 applications. Since the model 5550-S released in 1988, the Display Adapter II that improved the PS/2 compatibility was introduced. In the boot sequence, the Display Adapter enables VGA on the motherboard, and it passes the video signal from the motherboard to adapter's VGA connector. When using Japanese DOS, VGA is disabled, and the Display Adapter switches its video selector from VGA to own video chip. In addition, it added the 256 color mode (1024×768 pixels in 256 colors chosen from 262,144 colors). The adapter has 1 MB of video RAM, and 256 KB of RAM for user-defined characters.

Most PS/2-based models have compatibility with the Display Adapter II. VGA and the following display modes are supported:
1040×725 pixels with 80×25 characters in 8 colors or monochrome
1024×768 pixels graphics in 16 colors or monochrome
1024×768 pixels graphics in 256 of 262,144 colors

Later, XGA and VGA-only models were released. These later machines cannot run the special Japanese DOS, instead requiring the use of DOS/V with software-rendered kanji.

JIS layout keyboard 

The following keyboards have the PS/2 port. These keyboards have new scancode sets (81h, 82h, 8Ah) to support additional keys for Japanese input method.
 5576-001 - Same layout as 5550 type 1 (5556-001) keyboard.
 5576-002 - Japanese layout based on 101 Enhanced keyboard, but uses Alps Electric Co. mechanical key switches.
 5576-003 - Space-saving version of 5576-002
 5576-A01 - OADG reference keyboard.

Models 

 Tower
 5570-S, T, V (Early tower model. 5570-S, the first model of PS/55, doesn't support English versions of PC DOS and OS/2)
 5580-Y, W (Late tower model)
 Business Desktop (Predecessor to IBM PC 300/700 series)
 5560-W, N （Hi-end desktop）
 5550-S, T, V, W, N, Y, L, R （Mainstream desktop）
 5540-T （Low-end desktop）
 For small business, home users
 5530-Z, S, T, U, W (Desktop with integrated a display, Predecessor to PS/V Vision)
 5510-Z, S, T (VGA model. Predecessor to PS/V)
 Laptop
 5545-T (Integrated plasma display)
 5535-S (the first model pre-installed DOS/V)
 A4 Notebook
 PS/55 Note (Predecessor to ThinkPad. AT bus or MCA bus.)
 Rebranded IBM 5550
 Model G to P (1987-1991)

Competitors 

 NEC PC-98, N5200/N5300
 Fujitsu FMR
 Toshiba J-3100
 AX architecture

See also 

 DOS/V

References

Further reading

External links 
 PS/55, Japanese PS/2 Retrieved September 28, 2022

PS/55
Computer-related introductions in 1987